The Meaning of Meaning: A Study of the Influence of Language upon Thought and of the Science of Symbolism (1923) is a book by C. K. Ogden and I. A. Richards. It is accompanied by two supplementary essays by Bronisław Malinowski and F. G. Crookshank. The conception of the book arose during a two-hour conversation between Ogden and Richards held on a staircase in a house next to the Cavendish Laboratories at 11 pm on Armistice Day, 1918.

Overview
The original text was published in 1923 and has been used as a textbook in many fields including linguistics, philosophy, language, cognitive science and most recently semantics and semiotics in general.  The book has been in print continuously since 1982.  The most recent edition is the critical edition prepared by W. Terrence Gordon as volume 3 of the 5-volume set C. K. Ogden & Linguistics (London: Routledge/Thoemmes Press, 1995). The full publication history, including serialised publication in The Cambridge Magazine prior to the first edition of the book, is in W. Terrence Gordon's, C. K. Ogden: a bio-bibliographical study.

Richards sets forth a contextual theory of Signs: that Words and Things are connected “through their occurrence together with things, their linkage with them in a ‘context’ that Symbols come to play that important part in our life [even] the source of all our power over the external world” (47). In this context system, Richards develops a tri-part semiotics—symbol, thought and referent with three relations between them (thought to symbol=correct, thought–referent=adequate, symbol–reference=true) (11). Symbols are “those signs which men use to communicate one with another and as instruments of thought, occupy a peculiar place” (23). “All discursive symbolization involves […] weaving together of contexts into higher contexts” (220). So for a word to be understood “requires that it form a context with further experiences” (210).

The book later influenced A. J. Ayer's Language, Truth, and Logic, an introduction to logical positivism, and both the Richards–Ogden book and the Ayer book in turn influenced Alec King and Martin Ketley in the writing of their book The Control of Language, which appeared in 1939, and which influenced C. S. Lewis in the writing of his defence of natural law and objective values, The Abolition of Man (1943).

See also
 Embodied cognition
 General semantics
 Gostak
 Pragmatics
 Psycholinguistics
 Semiotics
 Charles Sanders Peirce

References

1923 non-fiction books
Linguistics textbooks
Philosophy of language literature
Philosophy of mind literature
Cognitive science literature
Pragmatics works
Psycholinguistics works
Books in semantics
Books in semiotics

External links 
 .